Boncompagni is a noble Italian family.

Boncompagni may also refer to:
Baldassarre Boncompagni, or Prince Baldassarre Boncompagni-Ludovisi (1821–1894), Italian historian of thematics and aristocrat
Filippo Boncompagni (1548–1586), Italian Cardinal
Giacomo Boncompagni (1548–1612), Italian feudal lord, the illegitimate son of Pope Gregory XIII
Gianni Boncompagni (1932–2017), Italian television and radio presenter, director, writer
Girolamo Boncompagni (1622–1684), Roman Catholic cardinal
Gregorio II Boncompagni (1642–1707), Italian nobleman and duke and grand-nephew of Pope Gregory XIII
Maria Eleonora I Boncompagni (1686–1745), Italian princess and marchioness
Pietro Boncompagni (1592–1664), Italian arts collector
Ugo Boncompagni (1502–1585), birth name of Pope Gregory XIII
Francesco Boncompagni Ludovisi (1886–1955), Italian politician

See also
Boncompagni Ludovisi Decorative Art Museum or Museo Boncompagni, Rome, part of the National Gallery of Modern Art of Rome
Casino di Villa Boncompagni Ludovisi, a villa in Porta Pinciana, Rome, Italy